OFC Botev Ihtiman is a Bulgarian association football club based in Ihtiman, currently playing in the South-West Third League, the third tier of Bulgarian football league system.

Current squad 
As of 1 August 2020

League positions

References

External links 
 Official page at Facebook
 Club profile at bgclubs.eu

Botev Ihtiman
Ihtiman